Khulna Development Authority (KDA) is a governing body in Khulna City, Bangladesh. It was established by an ordinance of East Pakistan government called The Khulna Development Authority Ordinance, 1961. It was established for better planning for Khulna city and its suburbs areas.

See also
 Khulna City Corporation
 Khulna Metropolitan Police

References

Government agencies of Bangladesh
Organisations based in Khulna
Urban development authorities in Bangladesh
1961 establishments in East Pakistan